The Horizon is a 1961 Soviet drama film directed by Iosif Kheifits.

Plot 
The film tells about a group of young guys who go to the virgin lands, start working there and create favorable conditions for future virgin soil.

Cast 
 Yuri Tolubeyev as Andrey Ivanovich Golovanov, director of the virgin state farm
 Boris Chirkov as Likhobaba, deputy director of the virgin state farm
 Aleksandr Safonov as Sergey Novoskoltsev
 Svetlana Melkova as Rimma
 Lyudmila Dolgorukova as Masha
 Valery Nosik as Misha
 Geliy Sysoev as Slava
 Mariya Lvova as Dusya
 Sergei Gurzo as truck driver
 Vyacheslav Podvig  as Zhenya
 Irina Gubanova as Vera
 Tatyana Doronina as  Klava, state farm woman
  Maya Bulgakova as Shura
 Leonid Bykov as foreman of the virgin state farm

Lyrics: Bulat Okudzhava

References

External links 
 

1961 films
1960s Russian-language films
Soviet drama films
Films directed by Iosif Kheifits
Soviet black-and-white films
Lenfilm films